Jeb Stuart (born January 21, 1956) is an American screenwriter, film director, and producer best known for writing blockbuster action films like Die Hard and The Fugitive and the Netflix television series Vikings: Valhalla.

Career 
Stuart grew up in Charlotte, North Carolina and Gastonia, North Carolina and graduated from Ashbrook High School. His father Dr. James Stuart was minister at First Presbyterian Church in Gastonia. He received Bachelor's and Master's degrees from the University of North Carolina at Chapel Hill, as well as an Masters of Arts in Communications from Stanford University. He is a former member of the graduate faculty at Northwestern University, where he taught in the Writing for Stage and Screen Program.

Stuart's first screenplay was that of the 1988 action film Die Hard, which was later revised by veteran screenwriter Steven E. de Souza. Adapted from the Roderick Thorp novel Nothing Lasts Forever, the film was a massive financial and critical success, spawning four sequels and being considered one of the greatest and most influential action films of all time. He helped pen the science-fiction horror movie Leviathan and the Sylvester Stallone prison thriller Lock Up.

Stuart was heavily involved in the writing of The Fugitive (1993), reworking David Twohy's original draft while on set and working with director Andrew Davis and stars Harrison Ford and Tommy Lee Jones. He wrote an early draft of Indiana Jones and the Kingdom of the Crystal Skull, entitled Indiana Jones and the Saucer Men from Mars, in 1995. In 1997, he made his directorial debut with Switchback, a thriller starring Dennis Quaid and Danny Glover. The film's negative critical reception led to Stuart semi-retiring from filmmaking for over a decade, before returning by writing, producing, and directing Blood Done Sign My Name, adapted from the autobiography of author and historian Timothy Tyson.

He is the creator of Netflix's Vikings: Valhalla a historical fiction drama television series, and a sequel to History's Vikings (2013 TV series). This spin-off series starts a century after the original series and will tell the tales of some of the best known Northmen in history: Leif Erikson, Freydis, Harald Harada and William the Conqueror.

Stuart is a WGA Best Screenplay Nominee as well as a two-time Edgar Allan Poe Nominee for best movie screenplay. He has received recognition for his writing from the American Film Institute and is a recipient of the Nicholl Screenwriting Fellowship, administered by the Academy of Motion Picture Arts and Sciences, of which he has been a member for over 25 years.

Personal life
He was married to his high school sweetheart Anne Bryant Stuart from March 1, 2001 until her death. They had two children, Alexandra "Lexi" Stuart and Baker Stuart.

Filmography

Film

Television

Awards and nominations

Nominations
 1988 Edgar Allan Poe Award for Best Motion Picture: Die Hard (with Steven E. de Souza)
 1993 Edgar Allan Poe Award for Best Motion Picture: The Fugitive (with David Twohy)
 1993 Writers Guild of America Award for Best Screenplay Based on Material Previously Produced or Published: The Fugitive (with David Twohy)

References

External links
 

1956 births
Living people
American male screenwriters
American film directors
American film producers
Writers from Little Rock, Arkansas
Screenwriters from Arkansas
University of North Carolina at Chapel Hill alumni
Stanford University alumni
Northwestern University faculty